The Unibuffel is a mine-protected wheeled MRAP Infantry mobility vehicle used by the Sri Lankan military, which is an improved version of the Unicorn, made by the Sri Lanka Electrical and Mechanical Engineers.

More than 53 Unibuffels had been manufactured as of 2006.

Production history
Although similar to the South African Buffel, it is built entirely by the Sri Lanka Electrical and Mechanical Engineers (SLEME). Initial research and development started in 1997 in an effort to field modernized MRAPs in Sri Lankan military service. First production started in 2000.

In 2019, SLEME began to upgrade Unibuffels with blast shock absorption seats and better protection. In 2020 full Air Conditioning was added to those being sent for UN peacekeeping operations in Mali.

Combat Usage

The Unibuffel proved quite successful in the Sri Lankan civil war, it could transport troops through rough terrain with ease, and had good protection, it participated in all Sri Lankan Army operations 2005 onwards.

When Sri Lankan troops joined United Nations Stabilisation Mission in Haiti, 16 Unibuffels was deployed to serve as their APC. 

In June, 2020 nine Unibuffels were deployed to Mali under urgent operational requirements for peacekeeping operations.

Design
The Unibuffel has an enclosed troop compartment and has gun mounts on the front and back to equip it with machine guns. The Typhoon 25mm cannon can also be equipped as a port defense weapon on a flatbed version.

Vehicles were powered by a TATA engine which can deal easily with rough terrain. Bulletproof glass was initially imported from China on a needed basis but later versions use glass manufactured by local suppliers.

Variants
The variants of the Unibuffel consist of following categories,
 Mark I
 Mark II 
 Mark II Improvised Version (Designed and Manufactured for UN Peacekeeping Missions)

Operators

: Known to be used by the Naval Patrolmen.

 Special Task Force: 15 Unibuffels handed to the STF.

See also
 Unicorn APC
 Avalon MPV
 UniCOLT
 Unicob

References

Further reading
 Surviving the Ride: A Pictorial History of South African-Manufactured Mine-Protected Vehicles by Steve Camp & Helmoed Römer Heitman

Wheeled armoured personnel carriers
Post–Cold War military equipment of Sri Lanka
Military vehicles introduced in the 2000s
Vehicles of Sri Lanka
Armoured personnel carriers of the post–Cold War period